The Third Cain Ministry was a ministry of the Government of Victoria (Australia). It was led by the Premier of Victoria, John Cain of the Labour Party. The ministry was sworn in on 17 December 1952, and resigned on 7 June 1955 when it was succeeded by the Bolte Ministry.

Three members of Cain's cabinet—Les Coleman (Minister of Transport), Bill Barry (Minister of Health) and Tom Hayes (Minister-in-Charge of Housing)—were expelled from the Labor Party on 31 March 1955 during the Australian Labor Party split of 1955 and formed the Australian Labor Party (Anti-Communist). They were replaced in their ministerial roles by Don Ferguson, Val Doube and John Sheehan respectively. Frank Scully, a Minister without Portfolio, was also expelled from the party and the cabinet—he was not replaced.

Portfolios

References

Victoria (Australia) ministries
Australian Labor Party ministries in Victoria (Australia)
Ministries of Elizabeth II